Tricypha mathani is a moth of the subfamily Arctiinae. It was described by Walter Rothschild in 1909. It is found in Colombia.

References

Phaegopterina
Moths described in 1909
Moths of South America